Lesley Johnston (9 June 1937 – 7 September 2006) was a cricketer who played one women's Test match for Australia in 1972. A left-handed batsman and slow left-arm orthodox bowler, she was one of thirteen cricketers to have taken a five-wicket haul on their debut in women's Test cricket. During her only international appearance, she claimed seven wickets for the concession of twenty-four runs in the second innings against New Zealand.

References

1937 births
2006 deaths
Australia women Test cricketers
Cricketers from Victoria (Australia)
Victoria women cricketers